Drummond—Arthabaska was a federal electoral district in Quebec, Canada, that was represented in the House of Commons of Canada from 1867 to 1968.

It was created by the British North America Act, 1867. It was amalgamated into the Richmond, Drummond and Lotbinière electoral districts in 1966.

Members of Parliament

This riding elected the following Members of Parliament:

Election results

See also
 List of Canadian federal electoral districts
 Past Canadian electoral districts

External links
Riding history from the Library of Parliament

Former federal electoral districts of Quebec